Azer-Turk Bank is Azerbaijani state-owned bank that provides retail and commercial banking services. It is an open joint stock company established on May 25, 1995 based on a license issued by the National Bank of Azerbaijan Republic. , the bank's total capital exceeded AZN 50 mln (US$29 mln).

Based on the banks license it can attract deposits, grant credits in its own name, as well as to perform transfers and settlement-and-cash transactions on behalf of clients.  It can also carry out other types of activities stipulated by the Bank Law of the Azerbaijani Republic at its own or clients’ expense, excluding activities in the field of purchase and sale of precious metals and gems, attraction to deposit and placement of precious metals.

The Azer-Turk Bank Open Joint-Stock Company maintains correspondence relations with banks of Turkey, United States, England, Germany and Russia.

History 
The Azer-Turk Bank Open Joint-Stock Company was founded on May 25, 1995 on the ground of license number 234 of the Central Bank of Azerbaijan dated June 29, 1995 the Bank started its activities on July 11, 1995.

Operations 
The banking license issued by the Central Bank of Azerbaijan grants the Bank the right to attract deposits or other floating assets in national and foreign from physical and legal parties, grant credits in its own name and at its own expense, as well as to perform transfers and settlement-and-cash transactions on behalf of clients as a whole.

The Azer-Turk Bank is the member of the Inter-Bank Exchange Market of Baku, the Bank Association of Azerbaijan, the Stock Exchange of Baku, the MilliKart Processing Centre, the SWIFT and the KОMİS payment systems, as well as the Western Union, Universal Payment Transfer, Contact and Monex international quick money transfer systems, including the international card organization MasterCard International.

Owners 
The bank is majority state owned but has the following shareholders:

 Property Issues of Azerbaijan Republic (75.00%)
 Ziraat Bank of the Republic of Turkey (12.37%)
 AzRe Reinsurance OJSC (6.55%)
 Qala Life İnsurance Company OJSC (5.00%) 
 Ziraat Bank İnternational AG (1.08%)

Head office 
85; 192/193 J.Mammadguluzadeh str., Baku, Azerbaijan

External links
Bank website

References

Economy of Azerbaijan
Banks of Azerbaijan
Banks established in 1995